The Civil Rule Party (CRP), sometimes referred to as the Civil Rights Party, was a political party in South Korea. The party was the successor to the Democratic Party, supported by former President Yun Posun, and future Presidents Kim Dae-jung and Kim Young-sam. On May 11, 1965, it merged with the Democratic Party to become the People's Party.

History
In the aftermath of April Revolution and May 16 coup, figures from the de facto defunct Liberal Party were divided into factions such as Bae Jong-duk, future members of the Civil Rule Party such as Kim Beop-lin, members of the Democratic Republican Party such as Lee Hwal, and figures who strived to found a new independent party such as Lee Beom-seok. 

In the 1963 presidential elections the party nominated Yun Posun as its candidate. He finished second in the vote, losing to Park Chung-hee by 1.5%. In the November legislative elections it received 20.1% of the vote and won 41 seats in the National Assembly.

Electoral results

President

Legislature

References

Democratic parties in South Korea
Defunct political parties in South Korea
1963 establishments in South Korea
Political parties established in 1963
Political parties disestablished in 1965